Banffidae is an extinct family of vetulicolians that is the only family of the order Banffiata and class Heteromorphida, also known as Banffozoa. It contains the genera Banffia, Heteromorphus, and Skeemella. Banffids differ from vetulicolians of the class Vetulicolida in having a posterior body section with numerous segments, rather than the seven-segmented posterior body of vetulicolidans.

References

Vetulicolia